Tasta Church is a parish church of the Church of Norway in the southern part of the large Stavanger Municipality in Rogaland county, Norway. It is located in the Indre Tasta neighborhood in the borough of Tasta in the northern part of the city of Stavanger. It is the church for the Tasta parish which is part of the Ytre Stavanger prosti (deanery) in the Diocese of Stavanger. The concrete church was built in a rectangular design in 1977 using designs by the architects Jan Jæger and Per Faltinsen. The church seats about 450 people.

See also
List of churches in Rogaland
Informationen zur Jehmlich Orgel.

References

Churches in Stavanger
20th-century Church of Norway church buildings
Churches completed in 1977
1977 establishments in Norway